Amychus is a genus of beetles belonging to the family Elateridae. This genus is endemic to New Zealand.

Species
There are three recognized species:
Amychus candezei 
Amychus manawatawhi 
Amychus granulatus

References

Elateridae
Elateridae genera
Endemic insects of New Zealand
Taxa named by Francis Polkinghorne Pascoe